Club García Agreda are a Bolivian Professional Football Club based in Tarija. The team plays its home matches at Estadio IV Centenário. The club currently competes at Tarija Primera A. In October 2010 Garcia eliminated Ciclon in 2010 Copa Simon Bolivar and left them with only 1 point and no opportunity of reaching First Division
In 2011 Club García Agreda is the champion at Tarija Primera A. They win the championship unconquered (invicto)

National honours
First Division – Professional Era:
Champions: 1
Runners-Up : 15
Bolivian Football Regional Championships:
Champions:
Runners-Up : 1  (2010)

External links
Garcia Agregada juega segunda fase
Garcia elminia a Ciclon

Association football clubs established in 1951
Football clubs in Bolivia
1951 establishments in Bolivia